Bullous pemphigoid (type of pemphigoid) is an autoimmune pruritic skin disease which typically occurs in people aged over 60, that may involve the formation of blisters (bullae) in the space between the epidermal and dermal skin layers. It is classified as a type II hypersensitivity reaction, which involves formation of anti-hemidesmosome antibodies, causing a loss of keratinocytes to basement membrane adhesion.

Signs and symptoms
Clinically, the earliest lesions may appear as a hives-like red raised rash, but could also appear dermatitic, targetoid, lichenoid, nodular, or even without a rash (essential pruritus). Tense bullae eventually erupt, most commonly at the inner thighs and upper arms, but the trunk and extremities are frequently both involved. Any part of the skin surface can be involved. Oral lesions are present in a minority of cases. The disease may be acute, but can last from months to years with periods of exacerbation and remission. Several other skin diseases may have similar symptoms. However, milia are more common with epidermolysis bullosa acquisita, because of the deeper antigenic targets.  A more ring-like configuration with a central depression or centrally collapsed bullae may indicate linear IgA disease. Nikolsky's sign is negative, unlike pemphigus vulgaris, where it is positive.

Causes 
In most cases of bullous pemphigoid, no clear precipitating factors are identified. Potential precipitating events that have been reported include exposure to ultraviolet light and radiation therapy. Onset of pemphigoid has also been associated with certain drugs, including furosemide, nonsteroidal anti-inflammatory agents, DPP-4 inhibitors, captopril, penicillamine, and antibiotics.

Pathophysiology
The bullae are formed by an immune reaction, initiated by the formation of IgG autoantibodies targeting dystonin, also called bullous pemphigoid antigen 1, and/or type XVII collagen, also called bullous pemphigoid antigen 2, which is a component of hemidesmosomes. A different form of dystonin is associated with neuropathy. Following antibody targeting, a cascade of immunomodulators results in a variable surge of immune cells, including neutrophils, lymphocytes and eosinophils coming to the affected area.  Unclear events subsequently result in a separation along the dermoepidermal junction and eventually stretch bullae.

Diagnosis

Diagnosis consist of at least 2 positive results out of 3 criteria (2-out-of-3 rule): (1) pruritus and/or predominant cutaneous blisters, (2) linear IgG and/or C3c deposits (in an n- serrated pattern) by direct immunofluorescence microscopy (DIF) on a skin biopsy specimen, and (3) positive epidermal side staining by indirect immunofluorescence microscopy on human salt-split skin (IIF SSS) on a serum sample. Routine H&E staining or ELISA tests do not add value to initial diagnosis.

Treatment
Treatments include topical steroids such as clobetasol, and halobetasol which in some studies have proven to be equally effective as systemic, or pill, therapy and somewhat safer.  However, in difficult-to-manage or widespread cases, systemic prednisone and powerful steroid-free immunosuppressant medications, such as methotrexate, azathioprine or mycophenolate mofetil, may be appropriate. Some of these medications have the potential for severe adverse effects such as kidney and liver damage, increased susceptibility to infections, and bone marrow suppression. Antibiotics such as tetracycline or erythromycin may also control the disease, particularly in patients who cannot use corticosteroids. The anti-CD20 monoclonal antibody rituximab has been found to be effective in treating some otherwise refractory cases of pemphigoid. A 2010 meta-analysis of 10 randomized controlled trials showed that oral steroids and potent topical steroids are effective treatments, although their use may be limited by side-effects, while lower doses of topical steroids are safe and effective for treatment of moderate bullous pemphigoid.

IgA-mediated pemphigoid can often be difficult to treat even with usually effective medications such as rituximab.

Prognosis
Bullous pemphigoid may be self-resolving in a period ranging from several months to many years even without treatment. Poor general health related to old age is associated with a poorer prognosis.

Epidemiology
Very rarely seen in children, bullous and non-bullous pemphigoid most commonly occurs in people 70 years of age and older. Its estimated frequency is seven to 14 cases per million per year, but has been reported to be as high as 472 cases per million per year in Scottish men older than 85.  At least one study indicates the incidence might be increasing in the United Kingdom. Some sources report it affects men twice as frequently as women, while others report no difference between the sexes.

Many mammals can be affected, including dogs, cats, pigs, and horses, as well as humans. It is very rare in dogs; on average, three cases are diagnosed around the world each year.

Research

Animal models of bullous pemphigoid have been developed using transgenic techniques to produce mice lacking the genes for the two known autoantigens, dystonin and collagen XVII.

See also 
 Cicatricial pemphigoid
 Dystonin
 Gestational pemphigoid
 List of target antigens in pemphigoid
 List of immunofluorescence findings for autoimmune bullous conditions

References

Further reading

External links 

Autoimmune diseases
Chronic blistering cutaneous conditions